Matthew Davis, also professionally known as Matt Davis, is an American actor. He is mostly known for his roles as Warner Huntington III in Legally Blonde, Adam Hillman on the ABC comedy-drama What About Brian from 2006 to 2007 and Alaric Saltzman on The CW fantasy drama The Vampire Diaries from 2009 to 2017 as well as the spin-off series Legacies from 2018 to 2022. He starred on the short-lived CW mystery and horror drama Cult as Jeff Sefton, and had a recurring role on the CBS police drama CSI: Crime Scene Investigation as Sean Yeager.

Early life
Davis was born in Salt Lake City, Utah. He attended Woods Cross High School and the University of Utah.

Career
Davis co-starred with Reese Witherspoon and Selma Blair in the comedy Legally Blonde (2001), as Witherspoon's love interest Warner Huntington III. His notable film credits include Blue Crush (2002) with Kate Bosworth and Michelle Rodriguez, Tigerland (2000) with Colin Farrell and BloodRayne (2005) with Kristanna Loken.

Davis starred in The CW fantasy drama The Vampire Diaries, as Alaric Saltzman since 2009 and starred in the short-lived CW mystery and horror drama Cult, as Jeff Sefton that same year. Davis had a recurring role in the CBS police drama CSI: Crime Scene Investigation from 2013 to 2014 in the 14th season, as swing shift CSI Sean Yeager. He appeared in the sixth episode titled "Passed Pawns", the eighth episode titled "Helpless", and the 13th episode titled "Boston Brakes". He later returned to the hit The CW show The Vampire Diaries as Alaric Saltzman once again as a series regular. Davis currently stars in The CW series Legacies, a spin-off of The Originals, where he reprises his role as Alaric Saltzman.

Personal life

Davis married actress Kiley Casciano on December 23, 2018, and their first child, a daughter, was born in 2020. Their second daughter was born on 24 January 2022. They separated in 2023.

Filmography

Film

Television

References

External links
 
 

21st-century American male actors
American male film actors
American male television actors
Living people
University of Utah alumni
Male actors from Salt Lake City
Year of birth missing (living people)
Fellows of the American Physical Society